No tengo madre (English title: I have no mother) is a Mexican comedy telenovela produced by Carlos Sotomayor for Televisa in 1997.

On March 10, 1997, Canal de las Estrellas started broadcasting No tengo madre weekdays at 8:00pm, replacing Alguna vez tendremos alas. The last episode was broadcast on May 2, 1997 with Esmeralda replacing it the following day.

Natalia Esperón and Eugenio Derbez starred as protagonists.

Cast 
Eugenio Derbez as Eligio Augusto Maldonado/Julio Remigio Vasconcelos
Natalia Esperón as Abril Vasconcelos
Saby Kamalich as Tina Tomassi
Susana Alexander as María Malpica
Norma Lazareno as Margarita Malpica
Raymundo Capetillo as Norberto Nerón
Manuel Ojeda as Indalecio Madrazo/Inocencio Lemus Smasht
María Rubio as Mamá Sarita
Anadela as Consuelito Pulido #1
Andrea Legarreta as Consuelito Pulido #2
Anthony Álvarez as Angelito
Héctor Ortega as Ezequiel
Aurora Alonso as Doña Cata
Daniel Martínez as Tyson
Malena Doria as Gudelia
José Sierra as Maritzo
Roberto Antúnez
René Gatica
Luis Alberto Lacona
Víctor Lozada
Genoveva Moreno
Marcela Pezet
Georgette Terrazas
Jeanette Terrazas
Genaro Vásquez
Guillermo Zarur
Vanessa del Rocío
Gabriel Lozada
Flavio

References

External links

1997 telenovelas
Mexican telenovelas
1997 Mexican television series debuts
1997 Mexican television series endings
Spanish-language telenovelas
Television shows set in Mexico City
Televisa telenovelas